Jeong Ju-hu (born June 26, 1995) is a South Korean professional baseball infielder. The name before renaming is "Chung Joo-hoo". His older brother is Jeong Keun-woon, an infielder on the Hanwha Eagles. He graduated from Gwangju Jeil High School.

References

External links 
 Jeong Ju-hu on Mykbostats

1995 births
Living people
KBO League players
South Korean baseball players
KT Wiz players
Sportspeople from Gwangju